Carpenters with the Royal Philharmonic Orchestra is a compilation album by American duo the Carpenters. It was released on December 7, 2018, by A&M Records and Universal Music Enterprises. The album features Carpenters' "original vocal and instrumental tracks" accompanied by new orchestral arrangements by the Royal Philharmonic Orchestra. Richard Carpenter served as the album's producer, arranger and conductor.

The Target store exclusive CD and the Japanese release has "Please Mr. Postman" as a bonus track.

Track listing
All tracks arranged by Richard Carpenter; except "I Believe You" arranged by Paul Riser.

Charts

Certifications

References

2018 compilation albums
The Carpenters albums
A&M Records albums
Compilation albums published posthumously
Royal Philharmonic Orchestra albums
Albums produced by Nick Patrick (record producer)